Samantha-Jane Beckinsale (born 23 July 1966), known professionally as Samantha Beckinsale, and Sam Beckinsale, is a British actress. She played firefighter Kate Stevens in London's Burning.

Early life
Beckinsale is the only daughter of actor Richard Beckinsale and his first wife, Margaret ( Bradley). They divorced when Beckinsale was a young child and she did not see her father for years. Samantha was unaware that her father was Richard Beckinsale until she was 11. Beckinsale and her father reconnected and spent time together, prior to Richard's death in 1979. She is a stepdaughter of Judy Loe and half-sister of Loe's daughter, Kate Beckinsale. She studied drama at Clarendon College, Nottingham.

Television
In 1990, Beckinsale was chosen by LWT to play firefighter Kate Stevens in ITV's drama series London's Burning, which ran from 1986 to 2002. In 1989, Beckinsale guest-starred as WPC Martin in an episode of Thames Television's Never the Twain. Shortly after this, she was given the role of Lesley in the final three series of Thames Television's Shelley. In 1994, she was chosen by LWT to play the role of Gillian in the sitcom Time After Time which lasted two series.

In 1997, Beckinsale starred as Jilly Howell in the short-lived sitcom Get Well Soon and in 1998 she was chosen by LWT to play the role of Gillian Monroe in the short-lived sitcom Duck Patrol with Richard Wilson.

Personal life
In 2022, Beckinsale came forward as a survivor of domestic abuse. She is a patron of the Broxtowe Women's Project, which offers support for women suffering from domestic abuse. She wrote and produced a docudrama titled Love? which deals with coercive control in relationships.

Television and film roles

References

External links

English television actresses
English soap opera actresses
Actresses from Nottinghamshire
1966 births
Living people
Actresses from London
English people of Burmese descent
20th-century English actresses
21st-century English actresses